William Schley Howard (June 29, 1875 – August 1, 1953) was a U.S. Representative from Georgia, and cousin of U.S. Senator Augustus O. Bacon.

Born in Kirkwood, Georgia, of entirely English descent, Howard attended Neel's Academy. At the age of thirteen he began working at the Georgia House of Representatives, first as a page, in 1888 and 1889, then as Calendar clerk in 1890 and 1891. Howard served as private secretary to United States Senator Patrick Walsh of Georgia from August 8, 1894, to February 18, 1895. He then studied law, and was admitted to the bar in 1897, establishing a practice in Wrightsville, Georgia. Howard, enlisted in the Third Regiment, Georgia Volunteer Infantry, on July 2, 1898, and served as sergeant during the Spanish–American War. After the war, he returned to DeKalb County and resumed his law practice. Howard ran for public office, and was elected to the Georgia House of Representatives, where he had once worked as a page. He served from 1900 until 1901. From 1905 through 1911, Howard served as solicitor general of the Stone Mountain judicial circuit.

Howard was elected as a Democrat to the 62nd United States Congress, and re-elected to three succeeding Congressional terms (March 4, 1911 – March 4, 1919). He was an unsuccessful candidate in 1918 for nomination for the United States Senate. He resumed the practice of law in Atlanta, Georgia, until his death there on August 1, 1953. He is interred in Decatur Cemetery, Decatur, Georgia, alongside his wife, Lucia DuVinage Howard (September 27, 1885 - September 9, 1962).

His grandson, Pierre Howard, served as Lieutenant governor of Georgia from 1991 to 1999.

See also

References

External links
 

1875 births
1953 deaths
Politicians from Atlanta
American people of English descent
American military personnel of the Spanish–American War
United States Army soldiers
Democratic Party members of the United States House of Representatives from Georgia (U.S. state)
People from Johnson County, Georgia
People from DeKalb County, Georgia